Schenectady Light Opera Company (SLOC Musical Theater) is a nonprofit community theater organization in Schenectady, New York, established in 1926.  The current location of the theater is at the new performance art center at 427 Franklin Street, in downtown Schenectady. The company has presented over 200 shows at various locations for over 90 years.  The company presents amateur theater productions.

History of the Company 
The Schenectady Light Opera Company (SLOC) was born in 1926 when a group of Van Corlaer and Draper alumni joined to "present short plays containing songs and comedy acts." The group, directed by Mrs. Etta Moore, a music teacher in the Schenectady City School District, was known as the Bellevue Young People's Chorus. The group first presented concerts and short operettas before moving on to the Gilbert and Sullivan shows, Trial by Jury and Patience, in 1933–1934. In 1936 the Bellevue Young People's Chorus changed its name to Schenectady Light Opera Company.

In the spring of 1942 the Company disbanded for the duration of the war, due to the shortage of male members. In 1946 the group got together again and presented H.M.S. Pinafore at Mont Pleasant High School, the company's adopted home. The manpower situation still posed a problem. A note in the group's newsletter stated, "To maintain the balance of the parts, no new sopranos will be admitted unless they bring a male."

Another problem was storage. The company had accumulated vast quantities of costumes and sets, so a search was begun for a building SLOC could call "home." The old Craig School on Balltown Road seemed ideal; however, the zoning laws, made it necessary to petition the State Supreme Court in order to allow a membership corporation to own property. That was successful, and henceforth, Craig School was to be known as the Opera House.

Until 1950, productions were given at Mont Pleasant High School, with the exception of "road" shows to Cobleskill, Schoharie and East Greenbush. In November 1950, SLOC presented The Mikado, in the Erie Theater. "Move-in" became a SLOC tradition at the Erie. Friday night the sets were loaded at the Opera House and moved into the Erie after the late movie. Showboat was the last SLOC show at the Erie before it closed in 1956.

Burnt Hills High School hosted The Merry Widow in 1957, and Finian's Rainbow became the first SLOC show in the new Niskayuna High School. In 1959, SLOC first ventured into modern opera with presentations of The Telephone, Down in the Valley and RSVP. SLOC later produced The Medium and Amelia Goes to the Ball.

Although the theater continued to produce Gilbert and Sullivan in the 1950s, the productions of Brigadoon, Carousel, Showboat and Oklahoma! marked the transition from operetta to truly American musical theater.

The 1960s produced SLOC's first attempts at modern musical comedy- The Music Man, Where's Charley?, Guys and Dolls, and Bye Bye Birdie -as well as the classics, The King and I, My Fair Lady, Kiss Me Kate, and South Pacific. The decade closed with the beautiful She Loves Me, and the exciting West Side Story. The 1970s opened with the comedy A Funny Thing Happened on the Way to the Forum, and the operas Amahl and the Night Visitors and Help, Help, the Globolinks! The 1970s also brought productions of the popular Mame, Hello Dolly!, Annie Get Your Gun; Fiddler on the Roof and Gypsy.

In 1971 SLOC sold the "Opera House" on Balltown Road and purchased the Beth Israel Synagogue at 826 State Street, Schenectady. Thus began the huge task of turning the building into a theater. In 1972 the new Opera House officially opened with Jacques Brel. This was the beginning of the cabaret shows with table seating and wine, bread and cheese. The SLOC season now included two shows at the Opera House, two shows at Niskayuna High School, as well as concerts, revues and workshops.

In 1973 SLOC moved its set building operation to the Turn Verein gym located directly behind the Opera House. That closeness to our Opera House greatly aided all aspects of the technical needs for each production.

In 1974 SLOC made an early contribution to the nation's Bicentennial with a production of 1776. The company's George M! was also an exciting tribute to our country, but also, in the SLOC tradition, a most appropriate way to help celebrate its 50th anniversary. In 1976-1977 we were still performing four shows- two at Niskayuna High School and two at the Opera House. During 1977-1978 SLOC purchased a nearby State Street building to use as its costume house.

In April 1980 SLOC moved from, Niskayuna High School to Proctor's Theater, with Shenandoah, and continued its four-show season (two at the Opera house and two at Proctor's) until 1990 when SLOC did The Most Happy Fella at Proctor's Theater. In 1987 SLOC purchased a small building on Taurus Road in Niskayuna to use as its set-building facility. We no longer had to keep moving all our sets to rental venues.

In the fall of 1990 SLOC performed one more show at Niskayuna High School and then began performing only at the Opera House until presenting its 70th anniversary celebration in 1996 with a birthday bash at Proctor's.

In April 2010, SLOC purchased several buildings from the Albany Catholic Diocese that were St John the Baptist, between Franklin and Liberty Streets in Schenectady. This was a major undertaking in order to have sufficient space for performing, rehearsal, storage of costumes and equipment, on-site office and meeting needs, live-in property manager, rentals, plus parking and future additions for set construction and storage. It also is much nicer for audiences, production teams and other volunteers, since it is handicapped accessible, has convenient parking, restaurants within walking distance and is in Schenectady's developing arts district.

After SLOC purchased its new home, the Northeast Ballet Company also needed a new home and moved in as a lease tenant in October 2010. This fit the vision SLOC's Board and members had of creating a small performing arts complex for local groups. NEB has expanded their lease space as they have grown in the SLOC performing arts complex.

The opening production in February 2011 in the new theater complex was The Drowsy Chaperone, which played to packed houses. Many reviewers have written that the quality of SLOC's productions achieved a higher level since being in the new theater.

Since opening at its new theater, SLOC has presented highly acclaimed and award-winning productions including: The Drowsy Chaperone, Les Misérables (Youth Production), Hairspray, Fiddler on the Roof, Dirty Rotten Scoundrels, Guys and Dolls, Caroline, or Change, The 25th Annual Putnam County Spelling Bee (Directed by a high school student), and Young Frankenstein. SLOC has expanded its resources to offer youth the opportunity to develop their performing, technical and artistic skills with productions and workshops.

In March of 2020, the SLOC Board of Directors made the decision to close down the theater buildings and subsequently, the production of A Funny Thing Happened on the Way to the Forum that was due to open that week, in light of the COVID-19 pandemic. The theater did not produce another show until September of 2021 with Ordinary Days. During the shut-down, they were able to maintain the campus and reopen their doors due to the generosity of donors and their volunteers. The theater provided digital content in the form of workshops, panel discussions, informational videos and fundraisers during that year, which can still be found on their website.

SLOC's future plans are to improve the facilities with a new lobby and a set construction and storage facility. The SLOC Board of Directors has developed a new strategic plan, which provides guidance for operational improvements to strive for success internally as well as for its customers.

High School Awards Program 
SLOC holds an annual High School Awards program in which a committee of SLOC board members observe high school shows, then later in the year awards excellent performers and the top three high school musicals in the Capital District.

Current Board of Directors 2022-2023 
 President- Thomas Coon  
 Vice-president - John Meglino  
 Treasurer - Mark Viscusi  
 Secretary - Haley Van Etten
Board Members: 
 Rose Biggerstaff
 Amy Clark
 Thomas Coon
 Heather-Liz Copps
 Matthew Dembling
 Gabriel Hage
 Jeffrey P. Hocking
 Amy Jessup
 John Meglino
 Debbie Paniccia
 Elizabeth Sherwood-Mack
 Sonya Sidhu-Izzo
 Michaela Torres

Current Season (2022-2023) 
Once - September 16, 2022 - September 25, 2022
First Date - November 4, 2022 - November 13, 2022
A Little Night Music - January 20, 2023 - January 29, 2023
The Wedding Singer - March 17, 2023 - March 26, 2023
It Shoulda Been You - May 5, 2023 - May 14, 2023
The Complete Works of William Shakespeare (abridged) - July 14, 2023 - July 23, 2023

Past Productions

2020s
 2021-2022 Ordinary Days, The Glorious Ones, Songs For a New World, Merrily We Roll Along, Violet

2010s
 2019-2020 The Addams Family, Mary Poppins, 9 to 5 (musical)
 2018-2019 In the Heights, Grease (musical), The Wild Party, 1776, 42nd Street
 2017-2018 Cabaret, West Side Story, Jesus Christ Superstar, Curtains, Sister Act
 2016-2017 Annie Get Your Gun, Footloose, Urinetown: The Musical, Into the Woods, How to Succeed in Business Without Really Trying
 2015-2016 Legally Blonde, Beauty and the Beast, Sweeney Todd, Hair, The Producers
 2014-2015 The Rocky Horror Show, Shrek the Musical, South Pacific, Smokey Joe's Cafe, Spamalot
 2013-2014 Guys and Dolls, You're a Good Man, Charlie Brown, Caroline, or Change, The 25th Annual Putnam County Spelling Bee, Young Frankenstein
 2012-2013 Next to Normal, Little Shop of Horrors, Dirty Rotten Scoundrels, The Sound of Music, Sweet Charity, High School Musical on Stage!
 2011-2012 Ragtime, Aida, Baby, Fiddler on the Roof, Hairspray
 2010-2011 Pirates of Penzance, Nunsense, The Drowsy Chaperone, Les Misérables, Carousel
 2009-2010 The Pajama Game, Joseph and the Amazing Technicolor Dreamcoat, Side by Side by Sondheim, Kiss Me, Kate, 13

2000s
2008-2009  Thoroughly Modern Millie, Seussical, Jacques Brel is Alive and Well and Living in Paris, Assassins, The Scarlet Pimpernel
2007-2008  Kiss of the Spider Woman, The Music Man, Annie, Beguiled Again, Bat Boy: The Musical, Anything Goes
2006-2007  The Full Monty, Once on this Island, Hello, Dolly!
2005-2006  Songs for a New World, Nuncrackers, Sullivan and Gilbert, Nine,  Oliver!
2004-2005  Jekyll & Hyde, Gypsy: A Musical Fable, Triumph of Love, Grease
2003-2004  Jane Eyre, Babes in Arms, The Mystery of Edwin Drood, Victor/Victoria 
2002-2003  Company, A Funny Thing Happened on the Way to the Forum, Zombie Prom, City of Angels 
2001-2002  Camelot, The Melody Lingers On, Ruthless!, Damn Yankees 
2000-2001  Tommy, Little Me, And the World Goes 'Round, Big River
1999-2000  Shenandoah, Meet Me in St. Louis, The Robber Bridegroom, Follies,

1990s
1999  Mack & Mabel, Forever Plaid, 
1998  Sweeney Todd: The Demon Barber of Fleet Street, On the Twentieth Century, The Mikado,Blood Brothers
1997Guys and Dolls, Evita, She Loves Me, Me and My Girl
1996  Magic Of Cabaret, Godspell, Secret Garden, 70th Birthday Bash, They're Playing Our Song
1995  Nunsense, Falsettos, Into the Woods, A Chorus Line
1994  Man of La Mancha, Galaxy Shining Stars Benefit Concert, How to Succeed in Business Without Really Trying, Jesus Christ Superstar, A Little Night Music
1993  Jerry's Girls, You're a Good Man, Charlie Brown, Anne of Green Gables – The Musical, Dames at Sea
1992  Tied To The Tracks, The Pirates of Penzance, Cabaret, Fiorello!, The Rothschilds
1991  Baby, The Best Little Whorehouse in Texas, Chicago, Joseph and the Amazing Technicolor Dreamcoat
1990  Little Shop of Horrors, The Most Happy Fella, Sing For Your Supper, Annie

1980s
1989 	The Gondoliers, 1776, Lies & Legends, Harry Chapin, Mame
1988 	Once Upon a Mattress, Barnum, Jacques Brel is Alive and Well and Living in Paris, Li'l Abner, Cinderella
1987 	A Funny Thing Happened on the Way to the Forum, Fiddler on the Roof, 60th Anniversary Concert, The Sound of Music
1986 	Little Mary Sunshine, Kiss Me, Kate, H.M.S. Pinafore, Peter Pan
1985 	Starting Here, Starting Now, My Fair Lady, They're Playing Our Song, The Wizard of Oz
1984 	The 1940's Radio Hour, Hello, Dolly!, Hänsel and Gretel, Annie
1983 	I Love My Wife, The Music Man, Who Said What #2, Pippin
1982 	Applause, Oklahoma!, Sweet Charity, Oliver!
1981 	Candide, The King and I, The Boy Friend, Grease
1980 	Bells Are Ringing, Shenandoah, The Robber Bridegroom, Half A Sixpence

1970s
1979 	On a Clear Day You Can See Forever, Anything Goes, Carousel
1978 	The Apple Tree, A Little Night Music, Godspell, Guys and Dolls
1977 	Promises, Promises, Carnival!, Curley McDimple
1976 	10 Nights in a Bar Room, George M!, Godspell, 50th Anniversary Concert, Man of La Mancha
1975 	Damn Yankees, Funny Girl, Once Upon a Mattress, Gypsy: A Musical Fable
1974 	I Do! I Do!, 1776, The Fantasticks, High Button Shoes
1973 	Who Said What To Whom, Fiddler on the Roof, You're a Good Man, Charlie Brown, Fiorello!
1972 	Hello, Dolly!, Jacques Brel is Alive and Well and Living in Paris, Annie Get Your Gun
1971 	Mame, Oliver!
1970 	A Funny Thing Happened on the Way to the Forum, Amahl and the Night Visitors, Help, Help, the Globolinks!

1960s
1969 	She Loves Me, West Side Story
1968 	How to Succeed in Business Without Really Trying, The Sound of Music
1967 	Paint Your Wagon, South Pacific
1966 	My Fair Lady, The Most Happy Fella
1964 	The Medium, Amelia Goes to the Ball, Bye Bye Birdie, Kiss Me, Kate
1963 	Where's Charley?, Guys and Dolls
1962 	The Gypsy Baron, The Music Man
1960 	Song Of Normandy, Oklahoma!

1950s
1958 	Naughty Marietta, Fanny, La Périchole, The Telephone, R.S.V.P., Down in the Valley
1957 	The Merry Widow, Finian's Rainbow
1956 	Die Fledermaus, Show Boat
1955 	Music in the Air, Carousel
1954  The New Moon, Sweethearts
1953 	Brigadoon, The Yeomen of the Guard
1952 	School For Wives, The Red Mill
1951 	The Chocolate Soldier, Iolanthe
1950 	The Wizard of the Nile, The Mikado

1940s
1949 	The Gondoliers, Chimes of Normandy
1948 	The Sorcerer, Chanticleer Hall
1947 	The Pirates of Penzance, Robin Hood, Patience
1946 	H.M.S. Pinafore, The Firefly
1942 	A Waltz Dream
1941 	Iolanthe

1930s
1939 	The Mikado, H.M.S. Pinafore, Hänsel and Gretel
1938 	The Bartered Bride, The Gondoliers
1937 	Lovely Galatea, Trial by Jury, Patience
1936 	The Gondoliers, Chanticleer Hall
1934 	Patience, The Troubadour, The Monte Bank
1933 	Trial By Jury
1932 	Under Cuban Skies, Lovely Galatea
1931 	Marriage of Nanette
1930 	Bells of Capistrano
1929 	Sailor Made

Special Events
 The First Five Years - A fundraiser cabaret/revue night featuring songs from all the shows produced in the first five year at the current location.
 Spontaneous Broadway in partnership with Mop and Bucket Improv Company http://mopco.org/
 90th Anniversary Concert - March 24, 2017

External links 
 Schenectady Light Opera Company
 Mop and Bucket Company

Theatre companies in New York (state)
Community theatre